This is a summary of the history of Ecuador from 1895-1925. Eloy Alfaro is the outstanding standard-bearer for Ecuador's Liberals, much as Gabriel García Moreno is for the Conservatives. Some Marxist groups have also looked to Alfaro; although his political program was in no way socialist, it did prove to be revolutionary in the extent to which it stripped the Roman Catholic Church of the power and privileges previously granted to it by García Moreno. Catholic officials and their Conservative allies did not give up without a fight, however. During the first year of Alfaro's presidency, Ecuador was ravaged by a bloody civil war in which clergymen commonly incited the faithful masses to rise in rebellion against the "atheistic alfaristas" and were, just as commonly, themselves victims of alfarista repression. The foreign-born Bishops Pedro Schumacher of Portoviejo and Arsenio Andrade of Riobamba led the early resistance to Alfaro. A fullfledged bloodbath may well have been averted only through the magnanimous efforts of the outstanding historian and Archbishop Federico González Suárez, who urged the clergy to abandon the pursuit of politics.

Liberal Era

The Liberals can be credited with few further accomplishments of major proportions. The system of debt peonage that lingered in the sierra came under government regulations, albeit weak ones, and imprisonment for debts was finally outlawed in 1918. These and other limited social benefits gained by the Native Ecuadorians and the mixedblood montuvio (coastal mestizo) working class were overshadowed by the ruinous economic decline worldwide and the severe repression of the nascent labor movement at the hands of the Liberals during the early 1920s. Furthermore, Liberal rule did little to foster the development of stable democracy. On the contrary, the first half of the period saw even more illegal seizures of power and military-led governments than in previous decades.

A major cause of the instability of the period was the lack of unity within the PLR itself. Alfaro and a second military strongman, General Leónidas Plaza Gutiérrez, maintained a bitter rivalry over party leadership for almost two decades. Following Alfaro's first period in the presidency, Plaza was elected to a constitutional term of office that lasted from 1901 until 1905. In 1906, shortly after a close associate of Plaza had been elected to succeed him, however, Alfaro launched a coup d'état and returned to the presidency. Alfaro, in turn, was overthrown in 1911 after refusing to hand power over to his own hand-picked successor, Emilio Estrada. Four months later, Estrada's death from a heart attack precipitated a brief civil war that climaxed the rivalry between Alfaro and Plaza. Alfaro returned from his exile in Panama to lead the Guayaquil garrison in its challenge to the Quito-based interim government, which was under the military authority of General Plaza. The rebellion was quickly defeated, however; Alfaro was captured and transported to Quito via the same railroad that he had done so much to complete. Once in the capital, Alfaro was publicly and unceremoniously murdered, along with several of his comrades, by a government-instigated mob. Uprisings by his supporters (see Concha Revolution) were crushed. 

Shortly thereafter, Plaza was inaugurated into his second presidential term in office. It was the first of four consecutive constitutional changes of government: following Plaza (1912–16) came Alfredo Baquerizo Moreno (1916–20), then José Luis Tamayo (1920–24), and Gonzalo Córdova (1924–25). Real power during this second half of the period of Liberal rule was held, not by the government, but by a plutocracy of coastal agricultural and banking interests, popularly known as la argolla (the ring), whose linchpin was the Commercial and Agricultural Bank of Guayaquil led by Francisco Urbina Jado. This bank gained influence by loaning vast quantities of money to the free-spending government as well as to private individuals. According to Ecuadorian historian Oscar Efren Reyes, the bank was influential "to the point that candidates for president and his ministers, senators, and deputies had to have the prior approval of the bank". Many of the private loans were to members of the Association of Agriculturists of Ecuador, an organization that also received government funds intended to promote an international cartel of cacao growers, but which instead were used to line members' pockets.

All parties involved in la argolla, from the government officials to the bankers and the growers, were professed militants of the Liberal cause. It was not only the political fortunes of the party that fell victim to their financial activities, however, but also the national economy, which experienced runaway inflation as a result of the printing of money by the private banks. The severe economic problems during the final years of Liberal rule were also partially caused by factors beyond the control of the politicians. A fungal disease that ravaged Ecuador's cacao trees and the growth of competition from British colonies in Africa abruptly ended conditions that had favored Ecuador's exportation of cacao for over a century. What was left of the nation's cacao industry fell victim to the sharp decline in world demand during the Great Depression.

Ecuador's economic crisis of the early 1920s was especially devastating to the working class and the poor. With real wages, for those lucky enough to have jobs, eaten away by inflation, workers responded with a general strike in Guayaquil in 1922, and a peasant rebellion in the central Sierra the following year. Both actions were aimed at improving wages and working conditions; both were put down only after massacres of major proportions.

President Gonzalo Córdova, closely tied to La Argolla (the ring), had come to office in a fraudulent election. Popular unrest, together with the ongoing economic crisis and a sickly president, laid the background for a bloodless coup d'état in July 1925. Unlike all previous forays by the military into Ecuadorian politics, the coup of 1925 was made in the name of a collective grouping rather than a particular caudillo. The members of the League of Young Officers who overthrew Córdoba came to power with an agenda, which included a wide variety of social reforms, the replacement of the increasingly sterile Liberal-Conservative debate, and the end of the rule of the Liberals, who had become decadent after three decades in power.

History of Ecuador